Somaclonal variation is the variation seen in plants that have been produced by plant tissue culture. Chromosomal rearrangements are an important source of this variation.  The term  somaclonal variation is a phenomenon of broad taxonomic occurrence, reported for species of different ploidy levels, and for outcrossing and inbreeding, vegetatively and seed propagated, and cultivated and non-cultivated plants. Characters affected include both qualitative and quantitative traits.

Somaclonal variation is not restricted to, but is particularly common in, plants regenerated from callus. The variations can be genotypic or phenotypic, which in the latter case can be either genetic or epigenetic in origin. Typical genetic alterations are: changes in chromosome numbers (polyploidy and aneuploidy), chromosome structure (translocations, deletions, insertions and duplications) and DNA sequence (base mutations). A typical epigenetics-related event would be gene methylation.
                      
If no visual, morphogenic changes are apparent, other plant screening procedures must be applied. There are both benefits and disadvantages to somaclonal variation. The phenomenon of high variability in individuals from plant cell cultures or adventitious shoots has been named somaclonal variation.

Advantages
The major likely benefit of somaclonal variation is  plant/crop improvement. Somaclonal variation leads to the creation of additional genetic variability. Characteristics for which somaclonal mutants can be enriched during in vitro culture includes resistance to disease pathotoxins, herbicides, high salt concentration, mineral toxicity and tolerance to environmental or chemical stress, as well as for increased production of secondary metabolites.

Suitable for breeding of new species.

Disadvantages
A serious disadvantage of somaclonal variation occurs in operations which require clonal uniformity, as in the horticulture and forestry industries where tissue culture is employed for rapid propagation of elite genotypes.
 Sometimes leads to undesirable results
 Selected variants are random and genetically unstable
 Require extensive and extended field trials
 Not suitable for complex agronomic traits like yield, quality etc.
 May develop variants with pleiotropic effects.

Reducing somaclonal variation
Different steps can be used to reduce somaclonal variation. It is well known that increasing numbers of subculture increases the likelihood of somaclonal variation, so the number of subcultures in micropropagation protocols should be kept to a minimum. Regular reinitiation of clones from new explants might reduce variability over time. Another way of reducing somaclonal variation is to avoid 2,4-D in the culture medium, as this hormone is known to introduce variation.

See also
Somatic embryogenesis

References

Plant reproduction